Korobeiniki (Коробейники) is a poem by Nikolai Nekrasov first published in the October 1861 issue of Sovremennik magazine.

History
Nekrasov dedicated the poem to Gavriil Zakharov, his peasant friend and a regular hunting companion who'd prompted him the storyline of the poem. According to Nekrasov's sister Anna Alekseyevna's memoirs, her brother wrote the poem in his home village, right after returning from a hunting trip. Prior to its appearance in Sovremennik, Korobeiniki was published in the Red Books series started by Nekrasov specifically for the peasant readership; these books were distributed by the "ophens", vagrant traders, in the rural areas of Russia.

Soon after Korobeinikis publication, Nikolai Chernyshevsky used one of its fragments, "The Song of a Humble Tramp" (Песня убогого странника), in his proclamation campaign promoting the idea of the peasant revolution. The same song was quoted by Alexander Hertsen in the February 1, 1862, issue of Kolokol.

The beginning of the poem (its 24 lines) evolved into a well-known folk song of the same name, which became widely known at the Tetris theme tune.

Storyline
Part one
Ivan, the younger of the two peddlers (korobeinikis) seduces Katerina in the fields at night. The girl who is in love with him, chooses to buy just one turquoise ring, refusing to take any presents. Departing, he promises to marry her on return. 
Part two
Ivan and Tikhonych enter another village and get surrounded by the local women fascinated by their goods. The old man proves to be a shrewd bargainer; his younger friend is embarrassed by his ways of holding the price.
Part three
Out of the village and seeing a church, Tikhonych becomes remorseful, ashamed of the lies he had to tell poor women. He blames the war for the dire state of the market, with mothers crying for their soldier sons and having no money for dresses and finery.One line: "What's fun and games for the Tsar/Is grief for a common man" proved especially controversial: all the pre-1917 editions featured the changed version with царь (the Tsar) replaced by враг (vrag, the enemy) 
Part four
In the morning the two continue their journey. Again complaining about the poor trade, Tikhonych blames Paris for the way Russian women have suddenly all gone fashion minded ("Should you dislike your own nose /They'll glue you another one there," goes one line). 
Part five
Katerina works alone in the fields. Pining for Ivan whom she badly wants to marry, she extols her own virtues, including good character and the willingness to do all the hard work for her future husband. 
Part six
Looking for a shorter way back to Kostroma the travelers find themselves in the moors. A gloomy looking forest ranger with a gun offers himself as a companion. Having figured out there should be a lot of money with the men whose boxes are empty, he kills and robs them. Later in the village's pothouse he launches a spree and inadvertently lets his story out. The police arrives, the murderer is arrested, the dead bodies are found.

References

External links
"Korobushka" as performed by Dmitry Khvorostovsky

1861 poems
Poetry by Nikolay Nekrasov